The Virginia Slims of Detroit is a defunct WTA Tour affiliated tennis tournament played from 1971 to 1983. It was held in Birmingham, Michigan in the United States in 1972 and in Detroit, Michigan in the United States from 1973 to 1983. The tournament was played on indoor carpet courts.

Billie Jean King was the most successful player at the tournament, winning the singles competition three times and the doubles competition four times, partnering American Rosemary Casals twice and Czechoslovakian Martina Navratilova and South African Ilana Kloss once each for her doubles successes.

Past finals

Singles

Doubles

See also 
 1983 Virginia Slims of Detroit

References
 WTA Results Archive

External links

 
Carpet court tennis tournaments
Indoor tennis tournaments
Defunct tennis tournaments in the United States
Virginia Slims tennis tournaments
Recurring sporting events established in 1972
Recurring sporting events disestablished in 1983
Tennis in Detroit
Sports competitions in Detroit